Mansión is a district of the Nicoya canton, in the Guanacaste province of Costa Rica.

Geography 
Mansión has an area of  km² and an elevation of  metres.

Locations
Poblados: Acoyapa, Boquete, Camarones, Guastomatal, Iguanita, Lapas, Limonal, Matambuguito, Matina, Mercedes, Monte Alto, Morote Norte, Nacaome, Obispo, Pital, Polvazales, Pueblo Viejo, Puente Guillermina, Puerto Jesús, Río Vueltas, San Joaquín, San Juan (part), Uvita (part), Vigía, Yerbabuena (part), Zapandí

Demographics 

For the 2011 census, Mansión had a population of  inhabitants.

Transportation

Road transportation 
The district is covered by the following road routes:
 National Route 18
 National Route 21
 National Route 157
 National Route 158
 National Route 905

References 

Districts of Guanacaste Province
Populated places in Guanacaste Province